The Red Bull Rampage is an invitation-only freeride mountain bike competition held near Zion National Park in Virgin, Utah, United States, just to the north of Gooseberry Mesa. From 2001 till 2004, it was held off the Kolob Terrace Road, on the western boundary of Zion National Park.

History

The competition took place from 2001 till 2004. However, by 2005 the organisers canceled due to the increasing risk competitors were taking. After a three-year hiatus, Rampage returned in 2008 at a new venue. The organizers introduced wooden features for the 2008 event. Previously, the competition took place on a natural piste, meaning it was devoid of manmade features.

The event usually occurs in October. Its format is similar to freestyle skiing and freestyle snowboarding, where competitors are judged on their choice of lines down the hill, their technical ability and the complexity and amplitude of tricks. Since its inception, Red Bull Rampage has become one of the biggest events in the Freeride mountainbiking (FMB) calendar.

At the first ever Rampage in 2001, the prize money for the event was $8,000. In 2015, the total prize fund was $100,000.

Results

2023 
 Date: TBA

2022 
Date: 21 October 2022

Kelly McGarry Spirit Award: Tom van Steenbergen
Best Style Award: Jaxson Riddle
Best Digger Award: Brett Rheeder (team of Phil Mclean and Austin Davignon) 
Best trick: Brandon Semenuk (acid drop start)
Toughness Award: Cameron Zink

2021 
Date: 15 October 2021

Kelly McGarry Spirit Award: Brage Vestavik
Best Style Award: Jaxson Riddle
Best Digger Award: Jaxson Riddle and his team
Best trick: Tom van Steenbergen (flat drop frontflip)
Toughness Award: Cameron Zink

2019 
Dates: 22–25 October 2019

People's Choice Award: Szymon Godziek
Kelly McGarry Spirit Award: Tyler McCaul
Best trick: Brett Rheeder (can-can backflip)

2018 
Dates: 23–26 October 2018

People's Choice Award: Adolf Silva
Kelly McGarry Spirit Award: Brendan Fairclough
Best trick: Tom van Steenbergen (flat drop backflip)
Cameron Zink and Bas van Steenbergen withdrew before the start.

2017 
Dates: 26–27 October 2017

People's Choice Award: Antoine Bizet (44% votes)
Kelly McGarry Spirit Award: Pierre-Edouard Ferry

2016 
Dates: 12–14 October 2016

People's Choice Award: Brandon Semenuk
Kelly McGarry Spirit Award: Conor Macfarlane
Best trick: Carson Storch (step down 360 drop)
First double backflip in event history: Antoine Bizet
Prize fund: $200,000.

2015 
Dates: 15–16 October 2015

People's Choice Award: Brandon Semenuk (25% votes)
Best trick: Sam Reynolds (Superman over the Canyon Gap)
Prize fund: $100,000.

2014 
Dates: 29–30 September 2014

Best trick: Cameron Zink (360 drop)
Prize fund: $75,000.

2013 
Dates: 11–13 October 2013

Best trick: Cameron Zink
Prize fund: $55,000.

2012 
Dates: 5–7 October 2012

Prize fund: $40,000.

2010 
Dates: 1–3 October 2010

Prize fund: $25,000.

2008 
Dates: 5–6 October 2008

Prize fund: $20,000.

2004 
Dates: 30–31 October 2004

Prize fund: $15,000.

2003 
Dates: 16–19 October 2003

 Prize fund: $12,000.

2002 
Dates: 12–13 October 2002

There were 28 riders in the start list.
Prize fund: $10,000.

2001 
Dates: 20–21 October 2001

There were 22 riders in the start list. Twelve of them advanced to the final, including Myles Rockwell.
Best trick: Kyle Strait ($500 prize).
Prize fund: $8,000.

Statistics

References

External links 
 Red Bull Rampage (official website)
 Red Bull (official website)

Mountain biking events in the United States
Rampage
Cycling in Utah
Zion National Park
October sporting events
21st century in Utah